Darakert is a village in the Masis Municipality of the Ararat Province of Armenia.

Demographics 
The village had 2,723 inhabitants in 2011.

References

External links 
 
 Report of the results of the 2001 Armenian Census

Populated places in Ararat Province